Todd Widom and Michael Yani were the defending champions; however, they were eliminated by Ball and Rettenmaier in the semifinal.
Carsten Ball & Travis Rettenmaier defeated Brett Joelson & Ryan Sweeting in the final 6–1, 6–2.

Seeds

Draw

Draw

References
 Doubles Draw

Nielsen Pro Tennis Championship - Doubles
2009 Doubles